The Defence Fire Training and Development Centre (DFTDC, formerly FSCTE Manston) was the site of the Ministry of Defence's firefighter training. It occupied part of a former Royal Air Force base near the village of Manston in the southeast corner of England. The remainder of the former RAF Manston was part of Kent International Airport, a civilian airfield, until the site was closed on the 15 May 2014.

History

The USAF returned the Manston base to the RAF in 1959, and a number of training establishments were established there, including the Air Ministry Fire Training School. On 1 January 1989 the RAF consolidated the RAF Fire Fighting and Rescue Squadron from RAF Catterick to Manston, forming the RAF Fire Services Central Training Establishment (CTE). In 1995, the station was chosen to be the central training facility for all MOD firefighter training operations, and became MOD FSCTE.

On 31 March 1999, the remainder of RAF Manston closed, leaving FSCTE as the sole occupant of the previous domestic side of the base.  The airside part of the base was signed over to the existing commercial operator to form Kent International Airport. In April 2007 the Army assumed responsibility for firefighting throughout the British armed forces, with the creation of the Defence Fire Risk Management Organisation (DFRMO) at Andover. This led to the transfer of FSCTE from RAF Strike Command at RAF High Wycombe to HQ Land Forces at Wilton (now Andover), controlled locally by HQ 2 Brigade at Shorncliffe Barracks, Folkestone.

On 22 October 2020, the final class of RAF fire fighters graduated at FSCTE before training moved to the Fire Service College, ending the RAF's 104 years association with Manston. Reservists from 3rd Battalion the Princess of Wales's Royal Regiment and an Air Cadet Squadron will remain on-site.

Manston Fire Museum
Inside the base, the old RAF CTE building was a museum of firefighting, especially as it related to the RAF, called the Manston Fire Museum. This started as the private collection of Flt Sgt Steve Shirley; when he was posted to Manston the RAF agreed to take it over and it opened as the Ministry of Defence Fire Museum in June 1995. It was renamed the Manston Fire Museum in November 1998.  The collection included vehicles, models, badges, patches, uniforms, helmets, prints, extinguishers and fire fighting equipment. The museum closed in 2014 and the collections were transferred to the Museum of RAF Firefighting at Scampton.

Manston Asylum Processing Centre

From February 2022 buildings and temporary structures located on the former DFTDC Manston site were being used as a processing centre for the people reaching the UK in small boats. Officially referred to by the Home Office as the Manston Asylum Processing Centre migrants are meant to be held at the facility for short periods of time while undergoing security and identity checks.

See also
 Defence Fire and Rescue Service

References

Works cited

External links

Manston Fire Museum

Military installations of the United Kingdom
Military training establishments of the United Kingdom
Education in Kent
Training establishments of the British Army
Firefighting academies
Military firefighting
Fire and rescue services of the United Kingdom
Military history of Kent
Museums in Thanet District
Firefighting museums in England
Defunct museums in England